This is a list of Maryland wildlife management areas. , the state of Maryland owned and managed sixty-one wildlife management areas (WMAs) covering  of land.

Management
Maryland wildlife management areass are managed by the Wildlife and Heritage Service of the Maryland Department of Natural Resources. Management focuses on developing wildlife habitat and providing publicly accessible space for hunting, fishing and trapping; low-impact non-hunting use is also permitted on many properties.

List of Maryland wildlife management areas
The following table lists all WMAs owned and managed by Maryland . It does not include Cooperative Wildlife Management Areas, which are managed by Maryland but owned by various other entities.

See also
List of Maryland state forests
List of National Wildlife Refuges in Maryland
Natural Environment Area (Maryland)

References

External links
Maryland Wildlife Management Areas

Maryland